Steel Troops is a South Korean reality show broadcast on Channel A and skyTV. Dubbed a "military survival program," the show features male South Korean reservists who served in various special forces units across different branches of the Republic of Korea Armed Forces. Participants go head to head in teams of four, representing their respective unit to fight for the title of the best special forces unit in Korea.

A series of missions, designed by military experts, test the participants' physical stamina, mental strength, and cooperation to determine the last team standing. Episodes also include concurrent commentary from a panel of hosts, including the "Master" who runs the competition events.

Season 1 aired every Tuesday at 22:30 (KST) from March 23, 2021 to July 20, 2021. This season featured 24 participants from 6 units across the Republic of Korea Army and Republic of Korea Navy. It was also released on Netflix under the title The Iron Squad and gained a high viewership ranking on release.

Season 2 aired every Tuesday at 21:20 (KST) from February 22, 2022 to June 7, 2022. The new season introduces 2 new units not featured in Season 1, including one from the Republic of Korea Air Force, for a total of 32 participants hailing from 8 units.

Hosts

Main Panelists 
 Kim Sung-joo
 Jang Dong-min
 Kim Hee-chul
 Kim Dong-hyun
 Choi Young-jae (Master)
 Chuu (Season 1)
An Yu-jin (Season 2)

Guest Panelists 
  (Season 1, Ep. 13; Season 2, Ep. 6, 10-14)
 Yujeong (Brave Girls) (Season 1, Ep. 14)
 Oh Jong-hyuk (Season 2, Ep. 5, 9)
 Yuk Jun-Seo (Season 2, Ep. 9-12)

Participants 
Each team consists of four reservists representing their respective special forces unit, with a team leader (indicated in bold) selected by the team members.

Season 1

Season 2

List of episodes 

Season 1

Season 2

Mission results

Season 1 
The first three elimination stages followed a double-elimination tournament style, with a main mission (indicated in bold) determining the participants of the "Death Match" elimination round. Following the revival round, the competition switched to a single-elimination style without a Death Match. Each stage also featured "Benefit Mission(s)," where the winner would be given an advantage in the main mission that followed. In the case of the second elimination stage, the lowest-ranking team was also sent directly to Death Match, bypassing the main mission.

Season 2 
The second season continues with the format of main missions and Death Matches, with the exception of the first elimination stage which was a direction elimination round. The advantages provided in Benefit Missions have also been upgraded in quantity and quality. For example, in the case of the second elimination stage, the top-ranking team bypasses the main mission and automatically advances to the next stage.

Notes

References

External links 
 Season 1 website
 Season 2 website

2021 South Korean television series debuts
Channel A (TV channel) original programming
ENA (South Korean TV channel) original programming
South Korean variety television shows
South Korean military television series